The mixed ice dancing figure skating at the 2003 Asian Winter Games was held on 2, 3 and 4 February 2003 at Aomori Prefectural Skating Rink, Japan.

Schedule
All times are Japan Standard Time (UTC+09:00)

Results

References

Results
Results

External links
Schedule

Ice dancing